Monks Investment Trust was incorporated in 1929 and was one of three trusts founded in the late 1920s by a group of investors headed by Sir Auckland (later Lord) Geddes. The other two trusts were The Friars Investment Trust and The Abbots Investment Trust. The company secretary's office was at 13/14 Austin Friars in the City of London hence the names. Sir Auckland Geddes was a former professor of anatomy who, during the First World War, had become Director of Recruiting at the War Office. He then went on to become a Unionist MP and a Cabinet Minister as President of the Board of Trade.

In 1931, Baillie Gifford & Co took over the management of all three companies. In 1968, under a Scheme of Arrangement, the three trusts were merged with Monks acquiring the ordinary share capital of Friars and Abbots. The company is listed on the London Stock Exchange and it is a constituent of the FTSE 250 Index.

References

External links
Monks Investment Trust Website
Baillie Gifford & Co Website

Investment trusts of the United Kingdom
Companies based in Edinburgh
Financial services companies established in 1929
1929 establishments in the United Kingdom